Brahmadeva  is a 2009 Indian Tamil-language thriller film directed by V. S. Dharmalinga. The film stars Dr. Ram, Tejashree and Sanjay. The film's music is composed by Muthu Raja.

Cast 
Dr. Ram as Eisa
Tejashree as Sampangi
Sanjay as Ezhil
Swati Verma
Roshan
Livingston as Dravidan
Mumaith Khan in an item number

Production 
The film's director Dharmalinga worked as an assistant to K. Rajeshwar. The film began production in 2011 and marks Tejashree's lead debut and Swati Verma's Tamil debut. The film was given an adults certificate without any cuts although at first the film was given a U/A certificate with fourteen cuts. Ramana's father starred in the film. The film explores the concept of the seventh sense.

Reception 
A critic from The New Indian Express wrote that "A better focus and clarity in the etching of the script of \'Elisa\', could have worked to the film’s advantage". A critic from the IANS wrote that "Brahma Deva is yet another reincarnation-revenge drama and director Dharmalinga has used decades' old method to narrate it".

References

External links 
Doctor becomes actor Indiaglitz
Medico's date on screen Indiaglitz
Doctors turn actors for Brahmadeva Behindwoods
Kiss & tell The Times of India